The 1926–27 Torquay United F.C. season was Torquay United's sixth season in competitive football and their fifth season in the Southern League.  The season ran from 1 July 1926 to 30 June 1927.

Overview
For the second season in succession, Torquay United found themselves competing in both the Southern League and the Western League.  With the Professional Section of the Western League now expanded to include twelve teams, United had to play a total of 48 games spread across the two leagues.  The Magpies certainly rose to the challenge in both competitions.  In the Southern League, Percy Mackrill's men were particularly impressive at Plainmoor where only a shock Boxing Day defeat to Bath City prevented the team from achieving a 100% home record.  United also suffered just one home defeat in their Western League campaign, a 2–0 loss to eventual champions Bristol City Reserves.  However, in the Southern League, it was the Magpies who prevailed over City's Reserves and Torquay United were crowned winners of the Western Section in April.  As Western champions, Torquay met the winners of the Eastern Section, Brighton & Hove Albion Reserves, in the Southern League play-off final.  However, United lost the game 4-0 making Brighton's Reserves the overall Southern League champions.

Following an impressive display against Third Division South side Reading in the previous season's FA Cup, Torquay were this season given a bye to the First Round proper.  United again gave a good account of themselves against Football League opposition when, after holding Bristol Rovers to a 1–1 draw at Plainmoor, they were unfortunate to be beaten 1–0 in the replay at the Eastville Stadium in a game in which Torquay missed a penalty.

Having enjoyed such a successful season, Torquay United now made a second attempt to gain membership of the Football League.  Although they hadn't received a single vote in their previous attempt to enter the Third Division South in 1922, United's bid was now far more credible and was reflected in the votes cast this time around.  At the Football League's meeting in London's Connaught Rooms on 30 May, one of the two current League clubs up for re-election, Watford, won a respectable 44 votes, while the other, Aberdare Athletic, found themselves tied with Torquay in second place on 21 votes each.  Despite claims by Aberdare's secretary of a biased scrutineer, a second vote went in the Magpies favour with a 26–19 split meaning that Torquay United would now be taking the Welsh team's place in the 1927–28 season of the Third Division South.

After nearly thirty years of organised football and various team mergers and name changes, the town of Torquay finally had a Football League club of its own.

League statistics

Southern League Western Section

Western League Professional Section

Results

Southern League Western Section

Southern League play-off final

Western League Professional Section

FA Cup

Devon Professional Trophy

References

External links

Torquay United
Torquay United F.C. seasons